Timoteo "Dino" Saluzzi (born 20 May 1935) is an Argentinian bandoneon player. He is the son of Cayetano Saluzzi and the father of guitarist José Maria Saluzzi.

Early life, family and education
Timoteo "Dino" Saluzzi was born in Campo Santo, Salta Province, Argentina. He began playing the bandoneon as a child. His father Cayetano Saluzzi was influential in his involvement with music. For much of his youth, Saluzzi lived in Buenos Aires.

Career 
Dino has been playing the bandoneon since his childhood. Other than his father, he was influenced by Salta musicians such as Cuchi Leguizamón, and by the lyrical strain of the tango of Francisco de Caro and Agustín Bardi. Dino described the vividness of his musical sketches as "an imaginary return" to the little towns and villages of his childhood. As a youth in Buenos Aires, Dino played with the Radio El Mundo orchestra. 

He played in orchestras professionally while also touring with smaller, sometimes jazz-oriented ensembles, developing a personal style that made him a leading bandoneonist in Argentine folklore and avant-garde music (especially since Astor Piazzolla did not participate in projects other than his own). His record career did not start until the 1970s, along with Gato Barbieri, when he released a couple of lyricism albums under the name of Gaucho. Over this decade, he worked on many tours in South America and specially in Japan, but always associated to other names, such as Mariano Mores or Enrique Mario Franchini.

Through word-of-mouth publicity (mostly from expatriate musicians), Saluzzi was invited to several European music festivals. He landed a contract with the ECM label. Several records have resulted, including Kultrum, 1983. From the beginning of the 1980s onwards, there were collaborations with European and American jazz musicians including Charlie Haden, Tomasz Stańko, Charlie Mariano, Palle Danielsson, and Al Di Meola.

ECM brought Saluzzi together with Charlie Haden, Palle Mikkelborg and Pierre Favre for Once Upon a Time ... Far Away in the South, and subsequently with Enrico Rava for Volver. Rava had worked extensively in Argentina, and Haden's sympathy for Latin American music was well known; furthermore Palle Mikkelborg and Dino Saluzzi had worked together productively in George Gruntz's band: there was a common ground on which an artistic exchange of ideas could take place. Saluzzi later played with Haden's Liberation Music Orchestra, and the Rava Saluzzi Quintet also toured.

In 1991, Saluzzi recorded an album with his brothers Felix and Celso and his son José María on guitar, kicking off his "family project", which has since toured many countries. Mojotoro drew upon the full range of South American music: tango, folk, cantina music, candombe, and the milonga music of La Pampa Province.

Anja Lechner and Saluzzi have toured widely as a duo, and US jazz magazine DownBeat declared their album Ojos Negros the Album of the Year (Best of 2007 list).

In 2015, Saluzzi won the Diamond Konex Award, one of the most prestigious awards given in Argentina, as the most important musician of the last decade in the country.

Saluzzi symphonic works were presented with Anja Lechner and Metropole Orkest at Muziekgebouw, Amsterdam, in February 2009.

Discography

As leader 
1972: De Vuelta a Salta (RCA Camden)
1973: Bandoneón Tierra Adentro – Vol. 1 (RCA Camden)
1975: Bandoneón Tierra Adentro – Vol. 2 (RCA Victor)
1977: Dedicatoria (Melopea)
1980: Bermejo (Microfón)
1982: Kultrum (ECM)
1985: Once Upon a Time – Far Away in the South (ECM)
1986: Volver  with Enrico Rava (ECM)
1988: Andina (ECM)
1991: Argentina (West Wind Latina)
1996: Cité de la Musique (ECM)
1998: Kultrum with the Rosamunde Quartett (ECM)
2001: Responsorium (ECM)
2002: Senderos (ECM)
2006: Ojos Negros (ECM), with Anja Lechner
2009: El Encuentro (ECM)
2011: Navidad de Los Andes (ECM), with trio including Anja Lechner and Felix Saluzzi
2020: Albores (ECM)

Los Chalchaleros Con El Bandoneón De Dino Saluzzi
1972: La Cerrillana (RCA Victor)

Dino Saluzzi Group
1991: Mojotoro (ECM)
2005: Juan Condori (ECM)
2014: El Valle de la Infancia (ECM)

Trio with Anthony Cox and David Friedman
1995: Rios (veraBra)

Trio with George Gruntz and Thierry Lang
2005: Trio Tage (PJL)

As sideman 
With Pedro Orillas
1970: Soy Buenos Aires (RCA Camden)

With Litto Nebbia
1981: Tres Noches en la Trastienda (Melopea), trio including Bernardo Baraj

With George Gruntz
1983: Theatre (ECM)

With Al Di Meola
1990: World Sinfonia (Tomato)
1993: World Sinfonia II – Heart of the Immigrants (Telarc)
1996: Di Meola Plays Piazzolla (Atlantic)

With Rickie Lee Jones
1991: Pop Pop (Warner Bros.)

With Maria João
1996: Fábula

With Tomasz Stańko
1998From the Green Hill (ECM)

With Giya Kancheli in quartet including Gidon Kremer and Andrei Pushkarev
2010: Themes from the Songbook (ECM)

References

External links 

Official website of Dino and José María Saluzzi
Dino Saluzzi at Myspace
Dino Saluzzi Interview at argentour.com
Saluzzi profile at European Jazz Network (archived)
Dino Saluzzi ECM recordings at music-wire.com

1935 births
Living people
Argentine bandoneonists
Argentine classical bandoneonists
Argentine musicians
Avant-garde jazz musicians
People from Salta Province
Tango musicians
ECM Records artists